The Boy in the Burning House is a young adult mystery novel by English-Canadian author Tim Wynne-Jones. It was first published in Canada in 2000 by Groundwood Books; the first American edition was published in 2001 by Farrar, Straus and Giroux.

Awards and honors
Winner of the 2001 Arthur Ellis Award for Best Juvenile or Young Adult Crime Book
Nominated for the 2001 Ontario Library Association Red Maple Award
Short-listed for the 2001 Ruth Schwartz Children's Book Award for Young Adult/Middle Reader Books
Winner of the 2002 Edgar Award for Best Young Adult Mystery
Named to the American Library Association's 2004 list of Popular Paperbacks for Young Readers
Short-listed for The Guardian's 2005 Children's Fiction Prize

References

2000 Canadian novels
Canadian mystery novels
Canadian young adult novels